Lorna Lee (born 16 July 1931) is a British athlete. She competed in the women's long jump at the 1948 Summer Olympics.

References

1931 births
Living people
Athletes (track and field) at the 1948 Summer Olympics
British female long jumpers
Olympic athletes of Great Britain
Place of birth missing (living people)